North European Aerospace Test range (NEAT) in Sweden is Europe's largest overland test range for aerospace systems.

It is a co-operation  by the Swedish Space Corporation and Swedish Defence Materiel Administration.

Its aim is to provide facilities and services for safe aerospace testing in one of the few parts of Europe which has very low population and almost no air-traffic.

Physical attributes
NEAT consists of two ranges in northern Sweden, Esrange Space Center outside Kiruna and Vidsel Test Range, that are combined with a bridging area in-between the two ranges.

Size
The total size of NEAT is 24,000 km2, and the one-way length is 350 km.

Restricted airspace
NEAT has two permanently restricted airspace areas.
 R01 covers Esrange Space Center and is 6,600 km2, GND/UNL altitude.
 R02 covers Vidsel Test Range and is 7,200 km2, GND/UNL altitude.

There is also four additional restricted airspace areas over the bridging area that are only used when needed.
 Over the west part, GND/3500 MSL
 Over the west part, 3500 MSL/FL200
 Over the whole area, 3500 MSL/FL330 in the west part and FL200/FL330 in the east part.
 Over the whole area, FL470/UNL

Suspended and restricted ground space

Restricted ground-space
 Esrange Rocket Impact Area is 5,200 km2.

Suspended ground-space
 Vidsel Test Range is 3,300 km2.

Notes

References

External links 
NEAT home: vidsel test range

Science and technology in Sweden
Military installations of Sweden